Judith Nadler is an American librarian and former director of the University of Chicago Library.

Early life
Nadler was born in Romania.  She studied at the University of Cluj and finished her undergraduate studies at Hebrew University.  She was awarded a Master of Library and Information Science from Israel Graduate School.

Career
In 1966, Nadler's first job at the University Library was cataloging foreign-language materials. She was successively promoted to Head of the Social Sciences Section, Head of the Cataloging Department, Assistant Director for Technical Services and then Associate Director of the Library.

In October 2004, she was named to replace Martin Runkle as head of the library. While serving as head, she oversaw the planning and construction of the Joe and Rika Mansueto Library. Nadler retired on June 30, 2014.

Judaica
Nadler raised much of the funding to build the Library's Judaica Collection.

 Professional activities
 Library of Congress’  Working Group on the Future of Bibliographic Control

Notes

External links
 "Working Group on the Future of Bibliographic Control, Inaugural Meeting," November 3, 2006

Year of birth missing (living people)
Living people
American librarians
American women librarians
University of Chicago staff
Romanian emigrants to the United States
Romanian Jews
Place of birth missing (living people)
21st-century American women